Nartey Polo  Amanor (born April 10, 1995) is a Ghanaian footballer who plays for AS Otôho as a defender.

Career
Polo Amanor began his soccer career in Ghana 2009 playing club soccer for lower tie club  Prampram Mighty Royals and 2010 Lazio FC.  Following his performance, he joined New Edubiase United between 2011 and 2014.

Rail Club du Kadiogo
Polo joined in 2014 Rail Club du Kadiogo.

AS Otôho
In January 2018, Polo joined AS Otôho on a year deal.

Honours
New Edubiase
Ghanaian FA Cup: 2012
Rail Club du Kadiogo
Burkinabé Premier League: 2016–2017, 2017–2018
Burkinabé SuperCup: 2017
AS Otôho
Congo Premier League: 2018

References

External links
Nartey Polo at Espn FC
Nartey Polo at Soccerway 
Nartey Polo at Save the Bet

1995 births
Living people
Ghanaian footballers
Ghanaian expatriate footballers
Footballers from Accra
Association football defenders
New Edubiase United F.C. players
Rail Club du Kadiogo players
AS Otôho players
Ghanaian expatriate sportspeople in Burkina Faso